Robert Quentin Crane (March 21, 1926 – January 5, 2018) was an American politician who served as Treasurer and Receiver-General of Massachusetts from 1965 to 1991. He was credited with starting the Massachusetts Lottery.

Early life
Crane was born in 1926 in Providence, Rhode Island. He received his education at English High School of Boston and Boston College. Crane served in the United States Marine Corps during World War II.

Career
Crane served in the Massachusetts House of Representatives from 1957 to 1964. He served as the chairman of the Massachusetts Democratic Party. Crane was appointed state treasurer in 1964. He defeated Louise Day Hicks, John Francis Kennedy, and John J. Buckley for the Democratic partys  nomination in 1964. He went on to easily defeat Republican Robert C. Hahn in the general election.

In 1971, became the founding chairman of the Massachusetts State Lottery. The closest Crane came to losing his office was in 1974 when he defeated Charles Mark Furcolo, a Boston attorney and son of former governor John Foster Furcolo, 51%-49% in the Democratic primary. He retired from politics in 1991, amid accusations of patronage and nepotism.

Death
Crane died on January 5, 2018, aged 91.

References

1926 births
2018 deaths
Boston College alumni
English High School of Boston alumni
Massachusetts Democratic Party chairs
People from Wellesley, Massachusetts
Politicians from Providence, Rhode Island
Military personnel from Massachusetts
State treasurers of Massachusetts
Members of the Massachusetts House of Representatives
Catholics from Massachusetts
Catholics from Rhode Island